Events from the year 1898 in Spain.

Incumbents
 Monarch – Alfonso XIII
 Prime Minister – Práxedes Mateo Sagasta
 Foreign Minister – José Canelejas
 Ambassador to the United States: Enrique Dupuy de Lôme

Events
 February 9 – publishing of the De Lôme Letter
 March 27 – Spanish general election, 1898
 April 11 – U.S. president William McKinley asks the U.S. Congress to declare war on Spain
 April 25 – beginning of Spanish–American War
 July 1 – Spanish–American War: Battle of El Caney
 July 3 – Spanish–American War: Battle of Santiago de Cuba
 December 10 – Treaty of Paris (1898)
 founding of Athletic Bilbao
 founding of Palamós CF

Births
 April 26 – Vicente Aleixandre
 June 5 – Federico García Lorca
 July 27 – Concha Méndez
 October 22 – Dámaso Alonso

Deaths
 July 1 – Joaquín Vara del Rey y Rubio
 July 3 – Fernando Villaamil

References

 
1890s in Spain
Years of the 19th century in Spain